The Inspectors is an American crime drama television series, created by Dave Morgan. and produced by Litton Entertainment. Centering on the criminal investigations of U.S. postal inspectors, it was the only show on commercial television paid for by a U.S. government agency, with its funding coming from the United States Postal Service asset forfeiture and consumer fraud awareness funds. The half-hour series ran from October 3, 2015 to May 25, 2019, and aired on Saturday mornings on CBS as part of the network's Dream Team Saturday morning three-hour block of children's programming.

Premise 
The series stars Jessica Lundy as a Postal Inspector who investigates crimes relating to U.S. Postal Service mail. The show also focuses on her personal life as a single mom with a son who became a paraplegic in the same crash that killed his father, also a postal inspector. At the end of each episode, Lundy and the Chief U.S. Postal Inspector, Guy Cottrell, give viewers tips on how to avoid being a victim of a scam similar to the episode.

Cast 

 Jessica Lundy as Amanda Wainwright
 Bret Green as Preston Wainwright
 Terry Serpico as Mitch Ohlmeyer
 Harrison Knight as Noah Waldman
 Erica-Marie Sanchez as Veronica Ruiz
 Carlos Bernard as Henry Wainwright (recurring)

In addition, Charmin Lee played the recurring role of Georgia Darby throughout the run of the series.

In the season one episode "Jersey Blues", Dan Marino makes a cameo appearance.

Production and broadcast 
The Inspectors was filmed largely in and around Charleston, South Carolina. The second season of the series premiered on October 1, 2016 and concluded on May 27, 2017. The series was renewed for a third season, which began on September 30, 2017. It reached the 100-episode milestone during its fourth and final season.

On September 4, 2019, Litton Entertainment announced the 2019 fall schedule for the CBS Dream Team block, revealing that The Inspectors had been dropped from the lineup. It was replaced by Mission Unstoppable, a new series hosted by Miranda Cosgrove. The series' cancellation was later confirmed through comment replies on Facebook.

Episodes

Series overview

Season 1 (2015–16)

Season 2 (2016–17)

Season 3 (2017–18)

Season 4 (2018–19)

Reception
The Inspectors was the subject of the final segment of the November 5, 2017 episode of Last Week Tonight with John Oliver. In the segment, Oliver criticized the show's writing as well as its approach to the subject matter and target demographic, but noted the importance of what the postal service was trying to do.

Awards and nominations 
The Inspectors was nominated for six Daytime Emmy Awards for the 2015–16 season, winning one, and two Daytime Emmy Awards for the 2018–2019 season, also winning one.

References

External links 
 
 

2015 American television series debuts
2019 American television series endings
2010s American college television series
2010s American crime drama television series
2010s American police procedural television series
CBS original programming
English-language television shows
Television shows set in Washington, D.C.
Litton Entertainment
United States Postal Service in fiction